The MacArthur Pine was an Eastern White Pine, located in the Nicolet National Forest, near Newald, Wisconsin.  It was the Eastern White Pine National champion, 1948–1971. It was named by a Milwaukee newspaper in 1945 in honor of General Douglas MacArthur.

Some  of the trunk was hollow. In 1977,  of its top blown was out. It was struck by lightning in 1986 and felled by a suspicious fire on June 23, 2001.

Notes

Forest County, Wisconsin
Individual pine trees
2000s individual tree deaths
Individual trees in Wisconsin